Mokhtar Hasbellaoui (or Hazbellaoui) (born 21 September 1963 in Algiers, Algeria), is an Algerian doctor and political figure. Since 2017 he has been Algeria's Minister of Health, Population and Hospital Reform.

References

Living people
1963 births
People from Dellys
People from Dellys District
People from Boumerdès Province
Kabyle people
21st-century Algerian politicians
Government ministers of Algeria
Algerian physicians